Étonnante was an 18-gun Etna-class corvette of the French Navy, launched in 1795. She was struck from the navy in 1804 and hulked in 1806.

Career 
However the British were not able to get close enough to assure the destruction of Étonnante. Still, they were able to capture Etna. The French were able with difficulty to salvage Étonnante.

Étonnante later served at Saint-Malo in 1797 and at Brest in 1802. She was struck in 1804. She then underwent conversion to a ponton arrière-garde or corps de garde. She disappears from records after 1806.

Citations

References

 

Age of Sail corvettes of France
1795 ships
Ships built in France
Etna-class corvettes